Derry is a male given name, often an abbreviation of Diarmuid or its anglicisiation Dermot. It can also be a diminutive of Alexander. Among those with the name are:

 Derry Beckett (born 1918), Gaelic footballer and hurler from Cork, Ireland
 Derry Clarke, Irish celebrity chef
 Derry Grehan (born 1937), Canadian guitarist with Honeymoon Suite
 Derry Hayes (c.1928–2005), hurler from Cork, Ireland
 Derry Irvine, Baron Irvine of Lairg (born 1940), British lawyer, judge, and political figure
 Derry Mathews (born 1983), English lightweight boxer
 Derry Moore, 12th Earl of Drogheda (born 1957), photographer
 Derry O'Sullivan, Irish poet 
 Derry Power (born 1935), Irish actor in The Fall and Rise of Reginald Perrin
 Derry Wilkie (1941–2001), British singer with Derry and the Seniors
 Derry Ross (born 1996), Computer scientist

See also
 Derry (surname)
 Derry (disambiguation)

Masculine given names
Hypocorisms